Depressaria indelibatella is a moth in the family Depressariidae. It was described by Hanneman in 1971. It is found in Mongolia.

References

Moths described in 1971
Depressaria
Moths of Asia